A Hall of Justice is an occasional term for a city's police headquarters, and exists in cities across the United States.  In some cases, the facility may house courts, jails and offices of other criminal justice agencies. In some US cities, the Hall of Justice is called the Justice Center.

Frank Murphy Hall of Justice (Detroit)
Hall of Justice (Los Angeles)
Hall of Justice (San Francisco)
Hall of Justice (comics), fictional superhero headquarters in DC Comics

See also
Justice Hall (disambiguation)